Fânari may refer to several villages in Romania:

 Fânari, a village in Gorgota Commune, Prahova County
 Fânari, a village in Olari Commune, Prahova County

See also
Fanari (disambiguation)
Fânațe (disambiguation)